John Richard Logan (born 1946) is a professor of sociology at Brown University, where he has taught since 2004. He is known for his research on housing discrimination and racial segregation in the United States.

References

External links
 Faculty page
 

1946 births
American sociologists
Brown University faculty
Columbia University alumni
Family sociologists
Living people
Political sociologists
University at Albany, SUNY faculty
University of California, Berkeley alumni
Urban sociologists